Andrey Makarenko (born 16 March 2002) is a Belarusian professional footballer who plays for Shakhtyor Soligorsk.

Honors
Shakhtyor Soligorsk
Belarusian Premier League: 2021
Belarusian Super Cup: 2023

References

External links 
 
 

2002 births
Living people
People from Vietka District
Sportspeople from Gomel Region
Belarusian footballers
Association football defenders
FC Shakhtyor Soligorsk players
FC Shakhtyor Petrikov players